This is a comprehensive discography of Pitchshifter, an industrial metal/rock band from the United Kingdom. The band have released six studio albums, four EPs, one live album, fourteen singles and one video album.

Albums

Studio albums

Extended plays

Remix albums

Compilation albums

Singles

Video albums

B-sides
"N.I.B." (Black Sabbath cover, "Triad" single)
"Floppy Disk" (Available on "Genius" single)
"You Are Free (To Do As We Tell You)" (Available on "Genius" single)
"Touch Me I'm Sick" (Mudhoney cover, available on "Dead Battery" single)
"Voted Least Likely to Succeed" (Available on "Dead Battery" single)
"Trancer" (Available on "Eight Days" single)
"Messiah" (Available on the rare "Cohesion" CD)
"St. Anger" (Metallica cover, available on "The Blackest Box - the Ultimate Metallica Tribute", featuring Logan Mader)
 "Making Plans for Nigel" XTC cover, available on "Genius" single)

Music videos

Other appearances

References

Heavy metal group discographies
Discographies of British artists